The 1949 Coupe de France Final was a football match held at Stade Olympique Yves-du-Manoir, Colombes on May 8, 1949, that saw RC Paris defeat Lille OSC 5–2 thanks to goals by Roger Gabet (2), Roger Quenolle and Ernest Vaast.

Match details

See also
Coupe de France 1948-1949

External links
Coupe de France results at Rec.Sport.Soccer Statistics Foundation
Report on French federation site

Coupe
1949
Coupe De France Final 1949
Coupe De France Final 1949
Sport in Hauts-de-Seine
Coupe de France Final
Coupe de France Final